BC Rakvere Tarvas is a professional basketball club based in Rakvere, Estonia. The team plays in the Latvian–Estonian Basketball League. Their home arena is the Rakvere Sports Hall.

Tarvas was relegated to the third Estonian division in 2017. On 19 June 2019, BC Rakvere Tarvas was again promoted to the Estonian-Latvian top tier league (Latvian–Estonian Basketball League).

History
Rakvere Tarvas was founded in 2006 by Andres Sõber and joined the top-tier Korvpalli Meistriliiga (KML) for the 2006–07 season, replacing another Rakvere based team, the financially troubled Rakvere Palliklubi. The team name Tarvas, meaning Aurochs in Estonian, is the symbol of Rakvere and is derived from the historic name of Rakvere, Tarvanpea (Aurochs' head). Rakvere Tarvas finished the 2006–07 regular season in 6th place, reaching the playoffs, where the team was eliminated by Tartu Fausto in the quarterfinals.

Andres Sõber strengthened the team significantly during the 2009 off-season by signing point guard Valmo Kriisa, young shooting guard Rain Veideman and centers Richard Anderson and Reinar Hallik. In February 2010, they were joined by forward Martin Müürsepp. Rakvere Tarvas finished the 2009–10 regular season in second place and reached the finals in the playoffs. In the finals, Rakvere Tarvas faced the top-seeded TÜ/Rock and lost the series 2 games to 4, despite winning the first 2 games. Valmo Kriisa and Rain Veideman were named to the All-KML Team, while Andres Sõber won the Coach of the Year award. After the season, Rakvere Tarvas lost several star players, including Kriisa, Müürsepp and Veideman, and failed to repeat their success in the 2010–11 season, finishing in fourth place. Rakvere Tarvas also joined the Baltic Basketball League for the 2010–11 season, but failed to advance past the group stage of the Challenge Cup competition.

Rakvere Tarvas spent the 2011 off-season rebuilding. The team re-acquired Valmo Kriisa and signed Latvians Kaspars Cipruss, Rinalds Sirsniņš and Juris Umbraško. In response, some Rakvere Tarvas fans started showing their support by attending games wearing Latvian national team uniforms. Rakvere Tarvas finished the 2011–12 regular season in third place and reached the semifinals in the playoffs, where the team was defeated by Kalev/Cramo. The team placed third in the final standings, after defeating Rapla 2 games to 0 in the third place games.

On 22 December 2012, Rakvere Tarvas won their first Estonian Cup, beating Rapla in the final 81–64. The team came third in the 2012–13 season, once again defeating Rapla in the third place games. Reimo Tamm was the KML top scorer with 16.36 points per game, while Brandis Raley-Ross and Juris Umbraško were named to the All-KML Team. Rakvere Tarvas competed in the 2013–14 EuroChallenge but failed to advance past the group stage with a 1–5 record. The team finished the 2013–14 season in third place, losing the semifinals against Kalev/Cramo 0 games to 3 and defeating Tallinna Kalev in the third place games 2 games to 1. The team folded after the 2016–17 season.

On 19 June 2019, BC Rakvere Tarvas was again promoted to the Estonian-Latvian top tier league(Latvian–Estonian Basketball League)

Home arena

 Rakvere Sports Hall

Players

Current roster

Depth chart

Coaches
Andres Sõber 2006–2017
Juris Umbraško 2017–2021
Martin Müürsepp 2021–Present

Season by season

Trophies and awards

Trophies
Estonian Championship
Runners-up (1): 2009–10

I Liiga
Champions (1): 2018–19

Estonian Cup
Winners (1): 2012
Runners-up (2): 2010, 2014

Individual awards

KML Best Young Player
 Rain Veideman – 2010
 Sander Saare – 2014
 Siim-Markus Post – 2017

KML Coach of the Year
 Andres Sõber – 2010

All-KML Team
 Brandis Raley-Ross – 2013, 2015
 Valmo Kriisa – 2010
 Rain Veideman – 2010
 Kaspars Cipruss – 2012
 Juris Umbraško – 2013

References

External links
 
 Rakvere Tarvas estlatbl.com

Rakvere Tarvas
Basketball teams established in 2006
Korvpalli Meistriliiga
Sport in Rakvere
Defunct basketball teams